Shahid Dastgheyb Metro Station is a station on Shiraz Metro Line 1 at Allah (Go-e Sorkh) Square. The station is located next to Shiraz Airport.

References

Shiraz Metro stations
Railway stations opened in 2017